San Pedro Pirates Football Club is a Belizean football team that competes in the Premier League of Belize (PLB). The team is based in San Pedro Town and plays home matches at Ambergris Stadium.

The team joined the PLB for the 2017–18 season. They won their first PLB championship in the 2018–19 closing season, defeating the Belmopan Bandits, who were defending champions. Head coach Tony Maldonado was named the season's Best Manager.

Current squad

References 

Football clubs in Belize
Association football clubs established in 2017
2017 establishments in Belize